The Bank of Somaliland is the central bank of Somaliland. Established in 1994, it serves as both a monetary authority and commercial bank for the territory. The central bank was provided for in the constitution of Somaliland. It has a head office in Hargeisa, in addition to seven other branches, and four foreign exchange offices in the airports at Hargeisa, Berbera, Borama and Gabiley. The bank has 12 branches throughout the country.

History 
In 1952, National Bank of India (NBI), which later merged with Grindlays Bank to form National and Grindlays Bank, established branches in Berbera and Hargeisa in what was then British Somaliland. NBI, the first bank in the protectorate, was the banker to the colonial government until in 1960 the State of Somaliland (formerly British Somaliland) joined the Trust Territory of Somalia (formerly Italian Somaliland) to form the Somali Republic.

After the bloodless coup d'état of 1969 that saw Mohamed Siad Barre's ascension to power, in 1971 the government nationalized the four foreign banks. The government combined Banco di Roma, Banco di Napoli, and National and Grindlays Bank to form the Somali Commercial Bank. The government also established the Somali Savings and Credit Bank to take over the commercial branches of Banca Nazionale Somala and Banque de Port Said, leaving the Banca Nazionale Somala with only central banking functions. The Somali Savings and Credit Bank had branches in Baidoa, Beledweyne, Berbera, Bosaso, Burco, Galkacyo, Qardho, Hargeisa and Kismayo, and for a time also in Djibouti. In 1990, the Commercial and Savings Bank of Somalia discontinued operations. The Central Bank of Somalia also ceased to function at an undetermined date.

The Bank of Somaliland was established in 1994, three years after the independence of Somaliland. It has branches in most cities and towns in the country, with a recent one being built in Oodweyne.

Objectives 
In line with Article 3 of the Constitutive Law of Somaliland Bank, the bank aims to:
maintain price and exchange rate stability
promote credit and trade condition which support balanced economic growth
support the economic and financial policies of the government where possible

Financial Organizations 
The Bank of Somaliland isn't recognised by any country which is a factor on why its not apart of many financial organizations or any at all. In 2022 the Bank of Somaliland "joined forces" with the Accounting and Auditing Organization for Islamic Financial Institutions or AAOIFI marking a turning point for Somaliland and its future.

Currency and Exchange Rate 

The central bank provides exchange services for various currencies at the official government rate, but most people prefer the unofficial rates used by hawala agents and money changers on the streets of main cities.

In November 2000, the official exchange rate of Baanka Somaliland was Sl.Sh.4,550/- for 1 US dollar. Unofficial exchange rates at the time fluctuated between Sl.Sh.4,000/- and Sl.Sh.5,000/- per dollar. In December 2008, the official rate had fallen to Sl.Sh.7,500/- per US dollar.

In December 2015, the generally recognized exchange rate was Sl.Sh.6,000/- per US dollar, and by July 2019, the generally recognized exchange rate had dropped to Sl.Sh.8,500/- per US dollar.

In December 2022, the official exchange rate of Baanka Somaliland was Sl.Sh.8530/- for 1 US dollar. The Somaliland exchange rate in 2019 was Sl.Sh.8,500/- per US dollar which is a 0.35% increase of inflation, the Somaliland Shilling remains stable around the 8,000 mark and will most likely decrease in inflation in the coming years.

Current pegged exchange rate is U.S. dollar = ~ Sl.Sh.580/12.

See also 
 Somaliland
 List of banks in Somaliland
 List of central banks of Africa
 Economy of Somaliland
 List of central banks
 Somaliland shilling
 Commonwealth banknote-issuing institutions

References

External links 
 

Banks of Somaliland
Economy of Somaliland
Companies of Somaliland
Somaliland
1994 establishments in Somaliland
Banks established in 1994